The following radio stations broadcast on AM frequency 1700 kHz: 1700 AM is a Regional broadcast frequency. It is the highest frequency allocated to the AM broadcast band in International Telecommunication Union (ITU) Region 2 (the Americas).

Mexico
 XEPE-AM in Tecate, Baja California

United States
All stations are Class B stations.

External links
 Radio Locator list of stations on 1700

References

Lists of radio stations by frequency